Pavel Pototsky may refer to:
 Pavel Pototsky (general)
 Pavel Pototsky (engineer)